Manduca bergarmatipes is a moth of the  family Sphingidae. It is found in Argentina and Uruguay.

Adults are on wing in November.

References

Manduca
Moths described in 1927